Ithycythara septemcostata is a species of sea snail, a marine gastropod mollusk in the family Mangeliidae.

Description
The length of the shell attains 9 mm, its diameter 3.5 mm.

(Original description) The strong, fusiform shell has a rather long siphonal canal. it is light yellowish-brown, with faint red-brown bands, interrupted by the ribs. There is one rather broad band, just below suture, the second below the periphery, a third near the base of the body whorl. The base of the siphonal canal is likewise tinted. The shell contains about 7 whorls, 2 form the convexly whorled protoconch, of which about the first whorl is smooth, the other ones are closely ribbed. The subsequent whorls are slightly convex, each with 7 continuous ribs, which have a small sharp point a little above the conspicuous, waved suture and are faintly crenulated, especially on lower part of the body whorl . The interstices are smooth, but for a faint spiral, connecting the costal points and a few spirals on the siphonal canal. The aperture is oblong, sharply angular above, with a rather long, narrow siphonal canal below. The peristome is not developed, probably with a shallow sinus above. The columellar margin is nearly straight, slightly directed to the left along the siphonal canal.

Distribution
This marine species occurs off Java, Indonesia.

References

External links
 
  Tucker, J.K. 2004 Catalog of recent and fossil turrids (Mollusca: Gastropoda). Zootaxa 682:1–1295.

septemcostata
Gastropods described in 1913